Sir John Trenchard (30 March 1649 – 27 April 1695) was an English politician and landowner.

Life
He belonged to an old Dorset family. He was born on 30 March 1649 at Lytchett Matravers, near Poole, to Thomas Trenchard of Wolverton (1615–1671), and his wife Hannah née Henley (d. 1691). His grandfather was Sir Thomas Trenchard of Wolverton (1582–1657), who was knighted by James I in 1613.

He was educated at Winchester (1661-1665) and at New College, Oxford (1665-1667). In 1667, he entered the Middle Temple and was called to the bar in 1674. John Trenchard entered parliament as member for Taunton in 1679. He associated himself with those who proposed to exclude the Duke of York from the throne, and attended some of the meetings held by these malcontents. It is possible he was concerned in the Rye House Plot. In fact, he was arrested at all of the events in July 1683, but no definite evidence was brought against him so he was released.

When Monmouth landed in the west of England in June 1685, Trenchard fled from England to Groningen, Netherlands. Around 1687–1688, he was pardoned through the good offices of William Penn, and able to return home. Again he entered parliament, but he took no active part in the Revolution of 1688, although he managed to secure the good will of William III. On 29 October 1689, he was knighted by the king, and made Chief Justice of Chester. In 1692, he was appointed Secretary of State. He and the government incurred much ridicule through their failure to prove the existence of a great Jacobite plot in Lancashire and Cheshire in which they had been led to believe.

Family
On 10 November 1682, he married:
Philippa Speke (1664–1743), daughter of George and Mary Speke of White Lackington, Somerset, with four sons and three daughters including:
 George Trenchard (d. 1758)
 Maria Trenchard (1687-)
 William Trenchard (12 October 1694-)

Sir John died on 27 April 1695 at Kensington, London, of tuberculosis  and he is buried at Bloxworth, Dorset.

See also
 Whig Junto

Notes

References
, which gives his year of birth incorrectly as 1640.

Attribution:

|-

1649 births
1695 deaths
Knights Bachelor
Alumni of New College, Oxford
People from Purbeck District
Secretaries of State for the Northern Department
Secretaries of State for the Southern Department
Recipients of English royal pardons
Members of the Green Ribbon Club
People of the Rye House Plot
English MPs 1679
English MPs 1680–1681
English MPs 1681
English MPs 1689–1690
English MPs 1690–1695
Members of the Middle Temple